The 2010 AFC Champions League was the 29th edition of the top-level Asian club football tournament organized by the Asian Football Confederation (AFC), and the 8th under the current AFC Champions League title. The final was held at the National Stadium in Tokyo on 13 November 2010. The winner, Seongnam Ilhwa Chunma, qualified for the 2010 FIFA Club World Cup in UAE.

Qualification
The preliminary qualification scheme for the AFC 2010 was released in 2008. A total of 38 clubs were due to participate in the 2010 AFC Champions League (eventually reduced to 37).

AFC assessment ranking

† One of the A-League clubs, Wellington Phoenix, is based in New Zealand, an OFC member country, therefore not being eligible to compete in the ACL.

Allocation of entries
Qualifying play-off (8 teams)
 United Arab Emirates,  Indonesia,  Singapore,  Thailand,  India,  Vietnam each have 1 team qualify
2009 AFC Cup finalists
However,  Al Kuwait, the 2009 AFC Cup winners, were removed as their league did not meet the Champions League criteria.

Group stage (32 teams)
2 qualifying play-off winners
4 teams qualified:   Iran,  China PR,  Japan,  Korea Republic,  Saudi Arabia
3 teams qualified:  United Arab Emirates
2 teams qualified:  Australia,  Uzbekistan,  Qatar
1 team qualified:  Indonesia

Teams
In the following table, the number of appearances and last appearance count only those since the 2002–03 season (including qualifying rounds), when the competition was rebranded as the AFC Champions League. TH means title holders.

* Number of appearances (including qualifying rounds) since the 2002/03 season, when the competition was rebranded as the AFC Champions League

Schedule

The ACL 2010 schedule was released on 17 July 2009. It will have the same format as the 2009 AFC Champions League.

Qualifying play-off

The teams have been divided into two zones. East has four teams while West has three after AFC Cup champions Kuwait SC's failure to fulfil the criteria set by AFC to compete in the play-offs. The draw for the qualifying play-off was held on 7 December 2009 in Kuala Lumpur, Malaysia. All losers from the qualifying play-off will enter the 2010 AFC Cup.

|-
!colspan="3"|West Asia Semi-final

|-
!colspan="3"|West Asia Final

|-
!colspan="3"|East Asia Semi-finals

|-
!colspan="3"|East Asia Final

|}

Group stage

The draw for the group stage was held on 7 December 2009 in Kuala Lumpur, Malaysia.

Each club plays double round-robin (home and away) against fellow three group members, a total of 6 matches each. Clubs receive 3 points for a win, 1 point for a tie, 0 points for a loss. The clubs are ranked according to points and tie breakers are in following order:
Greater number of points obtained in the group matches between the teams concerned;
Goal difference resulting from the group matches between the teams concerned; (Away goals do not apply)
Greater number of goals scored in the group matches between the teams concerned; (Away goals do not apply)
Goal difference in all the group matches;
Greater number of goals scored in all the group matches;
Kicks from the penalty mark if only two teams are involved and they are both on the field of play;
Fewer score calculated according to the number of yellow and red cards received in the group matches; (1 point for each yellow card, 3 points for each red card as a consequence of two yellow cards, 3 points for each direct red card, 4 points for each yellow card followed by a direct red card)
Drawing of lots.

Winners and runners-up of each group will qualify for the next round.

Group A

Group B

Group C

Group D

Group E

Group F

Group G

Group H

Knockout stage

Bracket

Round of 16
The draw for the round of 16 was held on 7 December 2009, along with the draw for the qualifying play-off and group stage. The matches were played on 11 and 12 May 2010.

|-
|+West Asia

|}

|+East Asia

|}

Quarter-finals
The draw for the remaining rounds was held in Kuala Lumpur, Malaysia on 25 May 2010. Because of the country protection rule, if there are two clubs from the same country, they will not face each other in the quarter-finals. Therefore, the two clubs from Saudi Arabia may not be drawn with each other in the quarter-finals. However, the same rule does not apply if there are more than two clubs from the country. Therefore, the four clubs from the Korea Republic may be drawn with each other in the quarter-finals.

The first legs were played on 15 September, and the second legs were played on 22 September 2010.

|}

Semi-finals
The first legs were played on 5 and 6 October, and the second legs were played on 20 October 2010.

|}

Final

The final was played on 13 November 2010. It was a one-leg match played at the National Stadium, Tokyo, Japan.

Top scorers
Note: Goals scored in qualifying round not counted.

Notes and references

External links
AFC Champions League Official Page 
2010 AFC Champions League at ESPN

 
2010
1